Syd Butler (born August 15, 1972) is the bassist and founding member of the indie rock and post-hardcore band Les Savy Fav. A few years later Butler became the owner and founder of Frenchkiss Records. Butler is also a current member of The 8G Band from the show Late Night with Seth Meyers. He currently has two children with his long-term partner, actress Amy Carlson.

Early life 
Syd Butler was born on August 15, 1972 in Memphis, Tennessee to Syd and Kay Butler. Despite being born in southwest Tennessee, Butler spent most of his adolescent years growing up in Washington, D.C. Butler grew up in the 1980s during the height of Dischord Records, who later became an influential factor that led to his creation of Frenchkiss. After graduating high school, Butler continued his education at the Rhode Island School of Design, where he later met his bandmates of Les Savy Fav.

Music career

Les Savy Fav 
Butler formed Les Savy Fav while studying film and video at the Rhode Island School of Design in Providence, Rhode Island, along with his now bandmates. The energy and idiosyncrasies of their live performances soon attracted a following, and the band started playing shows and touring across the United States and Europe.

Frenchkiss Records 
Butler started Frenchkiss in 1999 from an office in the Meatpacking District of New York City. The label's first purpose was to release Les Savy Fav's second full-length album The Cat and the Cobra. Although they eventually did release The Cat and the Cobra, Frenchkiss also started discovering and signing a wide array of bands. Some of these bands include The Hold Steady, Local Natives, The Dodos, Bloc Party and Passion Pit. It wasn't until then that Frenchkiss started gaining the exposure that they needed in order to be taken seriously in the tenacious industry they were in. Slowly they started to sell some records and they continued to sign quality artists who were ready for the challenge of making it in the music industry.

Butler directed some of the music videos for Frenchkiss bands including Ex Models's "Sex Automata", S Prcss's "Our Bikes Are Silver", Smoke and Smoke's "Into The Smoke And Smoke", The Dodos' "Winter", as well as his own band's videos for "Patty Lee" and "Rodeo."

Frenchkiss' future was looking bright. In April 2010, Butler formed a partnership with BMG/Chrysalis and started Frenchkiss Publishing, signing bands such as Gauntlet Hair, Dana Boy, Les Savy Fav and Exitmusic. Then in December 2011, Billboard released a story stating that Frenchkiss had signed a new, all-encompassing agreement with The Orchard for U.S. and international distribution, both digitally and physically. The following January, Frenchkiss Label Group formed as a hands-on boutique distributor, for smaller labels like ATP Recordings, Cavity Search, Cult, Godmode, Holiday Friends, JAXART, Pendu Sound, Underwater Peoples, White Iris, etc. When March 2013 rolled around, Butler partnered with actor-comedian David Cross and The Orchard Video Network to launch FKR.TV.

FKR.TV's focus was to create original creative content with new shows weekly. This would also include music videos, rare live performances by FKR artists, and unique content from the Frenchkiss archives.

Side Projects 

Butler has performed in various musical side projects such as Juiced Elfers, with Nicholas Thorburn of Islands, and on Desiderata with Amanda McKaye. In November 2012, it was announced that he, Les Savy Fav bandmate Seth, and Amy Carlson had formed a short-term band called Office Romance and released their Holiday EP, I Love The Holidays via Frenchkiss. As avid hockey fan, it was an exciting for him when he was a guest celebrity blogger for the National Hockey League during the Playoffs.

Late Night with Seth Meyers 
The 8G band is the house band for Late Night with Seth Meyers, formed by Butler's long-time friend Fred Armisen. One day Butler got a text from Armisen, asking to join the band. He along with Armison, Eli Janney, Marnie Stern, Les Savy Fav guitarist Seth Jabour make up the current roster of the 8G band. There are special guest each episode on the drums and some notable alumni include Kenny Aronoff, Matt Cameron, Patrick Carney, and Dave Lombardo.

Editorial
On April 22, 2012, Butler's book, Who Farted Wrong?, a collection of humorous drawings and anecdotes, was published via Write Bloody Publishing.

References

American music industry executives
1972 births
People from Memphis, Tennessee
The 8G Band members
Living people